Margaret Ann Pericak-Vance (born June 28, 1951) is an American human geneticist who is the Dr. John T. Macdonald Foundation Professor of Human Genetics and director of the John P. Hussman Institute for Human Genomics at the University of Miami. She is known for her research on the genetics of common human diseases. This research has led to a number of findings of genes that increase the risk of certain diseases, such as apolipoprotein E and Alzheimer's disease, IL7R and multiple sclerosis, and complement factor H and macular degeneration.

Education and career
A native of Buffalo, NY, Pericak-Vance attended Wells College, graduating in 1973 with a bachelor's degree in biology. She went to earn her Ph.D. in 1978 from Indiana University School of Medicine: Department of Medical and Molecular Genetics, where she studied under P. Michael Conneally. She did a post-doctoral fellowship at the University of North Carolina Chapel Hill under Robert C. Elston. She subsequently served on the faculty of Duke University, where she eventually became director of the Center for Human Genetics, James B. Duke Professor of Medicine, and Chief of the Section of Medical Genetics at Duke University Medical Center.

In January 2007, Pericak-Vance left Duke to help launch the Miami Institute for Human Genomics, which is now the John P. Hussman Institute for Human Genomics at the University of Miami's Miller School of Medicine.

Honors and awards
Pericak-Vance is a founding fellow of the American College of Medical Genetics. She was recognized in 1997 by Popular Science Magazine for The Best of What's New in Science and Technology for the Gene Identified for Alzheimer's Disease and by Newsweek Magazine as part of "The Century Club". In 2001, she received the Grand Prix scientifique de la Fondation Louis D. from the Institut de France for her research on Alzheimer's disease. She was inducted into the Western New York Women's Hall of Fame (2002) and received Wells College Distinguished Alumnae Award (2003) She was elected to the National Academy of Medicine in 2003. She received the Hauptman-Woodward pioneer of Science award in 2004. Dr. Pericak-Vance received the Alzheimer’s Association's Bengt Winblad lifetime achievement award in 2011, and was named a fellow of the American Association for the Advancement of Science in 2012. In 2014, she received the Ming Tsuang Lifetime Achievement Award from the International Society of Psychiatric Genetics. She was Awarded the Plaza Health Network Foundation's Women of Distinction & Caring Award in 2019.

Personal life
Pericak-Vance is  married to Jeffery M Vance, whom she met when they were both students at Indiana University School of Medicine. Vance was the founding chair of the Dr. John T Macdonald Foundation Department of Human Genetics at the University of Miami Miller School of Medicine. They had a son, Jeffery Joseph Vance, who died in 1998 from thrombotic storm, their daughter, Danica Davies Vance, is an orthopedic surgeon and their son, Richard L Belton, is a basketball coach.

References

External links
Faculty page

Living people
1951 births
American geneticists
American women geneticists
University of Miami faculty
Duke University faculty
Wells College alumni
Indiana University Bloomington alumni
Human geneticists
Members of the National Academy of Medicine
Fellows of the American Association for the Advancement of Science
Alzheimer's disease researchers
Fellows of the American College of Medical Genetics